Graco may refer to:
Graco (baby products)
Graco (fluid handling)